Carlos Cecconato (27 January 1930 – 12 December 2018) was an Argentine footballer who played as a midfielder.

Career
Born in Avellaneda, Cecconato played for El Porvenir, Independiente and Atlético Palmira. He scored 52 goals in 148 league appearances for Independiente. Ceccanato was a skilled attacking player, part of Independiente's Quinteto de Oro (Golden Quintet) until 1957 when he was sanctioned for two years by the AFA following a contract dispute with the club.

He also earned 11 caps for the Argentine national side between 1953 and 1956, scoring two goals.

Later life and death
He died on 12 December 2018 aged 88.

References

1930 births
2018 deaths
Argentine footballers
Argentina international footballers
El Porvenir footballers
Club Atlético Independiente footballers
Argentine Primera División players
Association football midfielders
Sportspeople from Avellaneda